Naja  is a genus of venomous elapid snakes commonly known as cobras (or "true cobras"). Members of the genus Naja are the most widespread and the most widely recognized as "true" cobras. Various species occur in regions throughout Africa, Southwest Asia, South Asia, and Southeast Asia. Several other elapid species are also called "cobras", such as the king cobra (Ophiophagus hannah) and the rinkhals (Hemachatus haemachatus), but neither are true cobras, in that they do not belong to the genus Naja, but instead each belong to monotypic genera Hemachatus (the rinkhals) and Ophiophagus (the king cobra/hamadryad).

Until recently, the genus Naja had 20 to 22 species, but it has undergone several taxonomic revisions in recent years, so sources vary greatly. Wide support exists, though, for a 2009 revision that synonymised the genera Boulengerina and Paranaja with Naja. According to that revision, the genus Naja now includes 38 species.

Etymology
The origin of this genus name is from the Sanskrit nāga (with a hard "g") meaning "snake". Some hold that the Sanskrit word is cognate with English "snake", Germanic: *snēk-a-, Proto-IE: *(s)nēg-o-, but this is unlikely. Mayrhofer calls this etymology "unglaubhaft ", "not credible", and suggests a more plausible etymology connecting it with Sanskrit nagna, "hairless, naked".

Description
Naja species vary in length and most are relatively slender-bodied snakes. All have a characteristic ability to raise the front quarters of their bodies off the ground and flatten their necks to appear larger to a potential predator. Fang structure is variable, all species except the Indian cobra (Naja naja) and Caspian cobra (Naja oxiana) have some degree of adaptation to spitting.

Venom
All species in the genus Naja are capable of delivering a fatal bite to a human. Most species have strongly neurotoxic venom, which attacks the nervous system, causing paralysis, but many also have cytotoxic features which cause swelling and necrosis, and have a significant anticoagulant effect. Some also have cardiotoxic components to their venom.

Several Naja species, referred to as spitting cobras, have a specialized venom delivery mechanism, in which their front fangs, instead of ejecting venom downward through an elongate discharge orifice (similar to a hypodermic needle), have a shortened, rounded opening in the front surface, which ejects the venom forward, out of the mouth. While typically referred to as "spitting", the action is more like squirting. The range and accuracy with which they can shoot their venom varies from species to species, but it is used primarily as a defense mechanism. The venom has little or no effect on unbroken skin, but if it enters the eyes, it can cause a severe burning sensation and temporary or even permanent blindness if not washed out immediately and thoroughly.

A recent study showed that all three spitting cobra lineages have evolved higher pain-inducing activity through increased phospholipase A2 levels, which potentiate the algesic action of the cytotoxins present in most cobra venoms. The timing of the origin of spitting in African and Asian Naja corresponds to the separation of the human and chimpanzee evolutionary lineages in Africa and the arrival of Homo erectus in Asia. The authors therefore hypothesise that the arrival of bipedal, tool-using primates may have triggered the evolution of spitting in cobras. 
 
The Caspian cobra (N. oxiana) of Central Asia is the most venomous Naja species. According to a 2019 study by Kazemi-Lomedasht et al, the murine  via intravenous injection (IV) value for Naja oxiana (Iranian specimens) was estimated to be 0.14 mg/kg (0.067-0.21 mg/kg) more potent than the sympatric Pakistani Naja naja karachiensis and Naja naja indusi found in far north and northwest India and adjacent Pakistani border areas (0.22 mg/kg), the Thai Naja kaouthia (0.2 mg/kg), and Naja philippinensis at 0.18 mg/kg (0.11-0.3 mg/kg). Latifi (1984) listed a subcutaneous value of 0.2 mg/kg (0.16-0.47 mg/kg) for N. oxiana. The crude venom of N. oxiana produced the lowest known lethal dose (LCLo) of 0.005 mg/kg, the lowest among all cobra species ever recorded, derived from an individual case of envenomation by intracerebroventricular injection. The Banded water cobra's  was estimated to be 0.17 mg/kg via IV according to Christensen (1968). The Philippine cobra (N. philippinensis) has an average murine  of 0.18 mg/kg IV (Tan et al, 2019). Minton (1974) reported 0.14 mg/kg IV for the Philippine cobra. The Spectacled cobras that are sympatric with N. oxiana, in Pakistan and far northwest India, also have a high potency of 0.22 mg/kg. 
 
Other highly venomous species are the 'forest cobras' and/or 'water cobras' (Boulengerina subgenus) are also highly venomous. The murine intraperitoneal  of Naja annulata and Naja christyi venoms were 0.143 mg/kg (range of 0.131 mg/kg to 0.156 mg/kg) and 0.120 mg/kg, respectively. Christensen (1968) also listed an IV  of 0.17 mg/kg for N. annulata. The Chinese cobra (N. atra) is also highly venomous. Minton (1974) listed a value of  0.3 mg/kg intravenous (IV), while Lee and Tseng list a value of 0.67 mg/kg subcutaneous injection (SC). The  of the Cape cobra (N. nivea) according to Minton, 1974 was 0.35 mg/kg (IV) and 0.4 mg/kg (SC). The Senegalese cobra (N. senegalensis) has a murine  of 0.39 mg/kg (Tan et al, 2021) via IV. The Egyptian cobra (N. haje) of Ugandan locality had an IV  of 0.43 mg/kg (0.35–0.52 mg/kg).

The Naja species are a medically important group of snakes due to the number of bites and fatalities they cause across their geographical range. They range throughout Africa (including some parts of the Sahara where Naja haje can be found), Southwest Asia, Central Asia, South Asia, East Asia, and Southeast Asia. Roughly 30% of bites by some cobra species are dry bites, thus do not cause envenomation (a dry bite is a bite by a venomous snake which does not inject venom). Brown (1973) noted that cobras with a higher rates of 'sham strikes' tend to be more venomous, while those with a less toxic venom tend to envenomate more frequently when attempting to bite. This can vary even between specimens of the same species. This is unlike related elapids, such as those species belonging to Dendroaspis (mambas) and Bungarus (kraits), with mambas tending to almost always envenomate and kraits tending to envenomate more often than they attempt 'sham strikes.

Many factors influence the differences in cases of fatality among different species within the same genus. Among cobras, the cases of fatal outcome of bites in both treated and untreated victims can be quite large. For example, mortality rates among untreated cases of envenomation by the cobras as a whole group ranges from 6.5–10% for N kaouthia. to about 80% for N. oxiana. Mortality rate for Naja atra is between 15 and 20%, 5–10% for N. nigricollis, 50% for N. nivea, 20–25% for N. naja, In cases where victims of cobra bites are medically treated using normal treatment protocol for elapid type envenomation, differences in prognosis depend on the cobra species involved. The vast majority of envenomated patients treated make quick and complete recoveries, while other envenomated patients who receive similar treatment result in fatalities. The most important factors in the difference of mortality rates among victims envenomated by cobras is the severity of the bite and which cobra species caused the envenomation. The Caspian cobra (N. oxiana) and the Philippine cobra (N. philippinensis) are the two cobra species with the most toxic venom based on  studies on mice. Both species cause prominent neurotoxicity and progression of life-threatening symptoms following envenomation. Death has been reported in as little as 30 minutes in cases of envenomation by both species. N. philippinensis purely neurotoxic venom causes prominent neurotoxicity with minimal local tissue damage and pain and patients respond very well to antivenom therapy if treatment is administered rapidly after envenomation. Envenomation caused by N. oxiana is much more complicated. In addition to prominent neurotoxicity, very potent cytotoxic and cardiotoxic components are in this species' venom. Local effects are marked and manifest in all cases of envenomation: severe pain, severe swelling, bruising, blistering, and tissue necrosis. Renal damage and cardiotoxicity are also clinical manifestations of envenomation caused by N. oxiana, though they are rare and secondary. The untreated mortality rate among those envenomed by N. oxiana approaches 80%, the highest among all species within the genus Naja. Antivenom is not as effective for envenomation by this species as it is for other Asian cobras within the same region, like the Indian cobra (N. naja) and due to the dangerous toxicity of this species' venom, massive amounts of antivenom are often required for patients. As a result, a monovalent antivenom serum is being developed by the Razi Vaccine and Serum Research Institute  in Iran. Response to treatment with antivenom is generally poor among patients, so mechanical ventilation and endotracheal intubation is required. As a result, mortality among those treated for N. oxiana envenomation is still relatively high (up to 30%) compared to all other species of cobra (<1%).

Taxonomy

The genus contains several species complexes of closely related and often similar-looking species, some of them only recently described or defined. Several recent taxonomic studies have revealed species not included in the current listing in ITIS:

 Naja anchietae (Bocage, 1879), Anchieta's cobra, is regarded as a subspecies of N. haje by Mertens (1937) and of N. annulifera by Broadley (1995). It is regarded as a full species by Broadley and Wüster (2004).
 Naja arabica Scortecci, 1932, the Arabian cobra, has long been considered a subspecies of N. haje, but was recently raised to the status of species.
 Naja ashei Broadley and Wüster, 2007, Ashe's spitting cobra, is a newly described species found in Africa and also a highly aggressive snake; it can spit a large amount of venom.
 Naja nigricincta Bogert, 1940, was long regarded as a subspecies of N. nigricollis, but was recently found to be a full species (with N. n. woodi as a subspecies).
 Naja senegalensis Trape et al., 2009, is a new species encompassing what were previously considered to be the West African savanna populations of N. haje.
 Naja peroescobari Ceríaco et al. 2017, is a new species encompassing what was previously considered the São Tomé population of N. melanoleuca.
 Naja guineensis Broadley et al., 2018, is a new species encompassing what were previously considered to be the West African forest populations of N. melanoleuca.
 Naja savannula Broadley et al., 2018, is a new species encompassing what were previously considered to be the West African savanna populations of N. melanoleuca.
 Naja subfulva Laurent, 1955, previously regarded as a subspecies of N. melanoleuca, was recently recognized as a full species.

Two recent molecular phylogenetic studies have also supported the incorporation of the species previously assigned to the genera Boulengerina and Paranaja into Naja, as both are closely related to the forest cobra (Naja melanoleuca). In the most comprehensive phylogenetic study to date, 5 putative new species were initially identified, of which 3 have since been named.

The controversial amateur herpetologist Raymond Hoser proposed the genus Spracklandus for the African spitting cobras. Wallach et al. suggested that this name was not published according to the Code and suggested instead the recognition of four subgenera within Naja: Naja for the Asiatic cobras, Boulengerina for the African forest, water and burrowing cobras, Uraeus for the Egyptian and Cape cobra group and Afronaja for the African spitting cobras. International Commission on Zoological Nomenclature issued an opinion that it “finds no basis under the provisions of the Code for regarding the name Spracklandus as unavailable”.

Asiatic cobras are believed to further be split into two groups of southeastern Asian cobras (N. siamensis, N. sumatrana, N. philippinensis, N. samarensis, N. sputatrix, and N. mandalayensis) and western and northern Asian cobras (N. oxiana, N. kaouthia, N. sagittifera, and N. atra) with Naja naja serving as a basal lineage to all species.

Species

 Not including the nominate subspecies
† Extinct 
T Type species

References

External links

 

 
Snake genera
Taxa named by Josephus Nicolaus Laurenti
Extant Miocene first appearances